The R278 road is a regional road in Ireland. It is a loop road from the R286 road in Counties Sligo and Leitrim.

The R278 goes via Calry in County Sligo and passes by Doon Lough in County Leitrim.

See also
Roads in Ireland

References

Regional roads in the Republic of Ireland
Roads in County Sligo
Roads in County Leitrim